Rătei River may refer to:

 Izvorul Rătei, a tributary of the Ialomița in Dâmbovița County, Romania
 Rătei, a tributary of the Cascue (Dâmbovița basin) in Argeș County, Romania